The phin pia is a chest-resonated stick zither with two to five strings. It is considered the national instrument of Northern Thailand. The one string version (equivalent to the Cambodian Kse diev) is the phin namtao.

References

External links
The Traditional Music of Thailand By David Morton, Chen Duriyanga (Phra) p.91 has pictures of phin pia and phin namtao.
Article on JSTOR, The Pia's Subtle Sustain: Contemporary Ethnic Identity and the Revitalization of the Lanna "Heart Harp," Andrew McGraw, Asian Music, Vol. 38, No. 2 (Summer - Autumn, 2007), pp. 115-142. [Subscription required]

Thai musical instruments
Stick zithers